Jacob Ruecroft (1 May 1915 – February 2005) was an English professional footballer who played as a full back for Goole Town, Halifax Town, Scarborough and Bradford City. He also guested for Leeds United and Lincoln City during World War Two.

References

1915 births
2005 deaths
English footballers
Goole Town F.C. players
Halifax Town A.F.C. players
Leeds United F.C. players
Lincoln City F.C. players
Scarborough F.C. players
Bradford City A.F.C. players
English Football League players
Association football defenders
People from Lanchester, County Durham
Footballers from County Durham